Dowdar or Dodar or Do Dar or Du Dar may refer to:
 Dowdar, Hormozgan
 Dowdar, Sistan and Baluchestan